The Secret of Rosette Lambert is a 1920 French film directed by Raymond Bernard.

Cast

 Lois Meredith as Rosette Lambert
 Sylvia Grey as Claire
 Paul Amiot as Lambert
 Camille Bert as Branchu
 Charles Dullin as Bertrand
 Henri Debain as James Janvier
 Jacques Roussel as Henri

See also
 1920 in films

External links
 

1920 films
Films directed by Raymond Bernard
French silent films
French black-and-white films
1920s French films
Silent crime films
French crime films